Kompanyaveediya also known as Kampong Kertel and Kompanna Veediya is a suburb in Colombo, Sri Lanka, located directly south of the Fort. The suburb contains Beira Lake, a large lake and its esplanade is visited by many for recreation. Slave Island is mostly a commercial area with hotels, shopping centres, street food stalls, and is known for its multicultural, especially Malay heritage.

History
The name "Slave Island" was coined during the period of British colonial rule and was a reference to the usage of the island under Portuguese rule as a holding area for African slaves, most of them from the Swahili coast and Portuguese East Africa. Many of these slaves later returned to Africa.  However, a small group of African descendants remain scattered throughout Sri Lanka and are collectively known as Sri Lankan Kaffirs.

In 2023, the Sri Lankan Prime Minister issued instructions to discontinue the use of exonym "Slave Island" in favour of "Kompanna Veediya”.

Demographic

Slave Island is a multicultural area known for its mix of Malay, Sinhalese and Tamil cultures and is a traditional Malay cultural district in Colombo. The larger ethnic communities in Slave Island are the Sri Lankan Malays, Sri Lankan Muslims and Sinhalese. There are also various minorities, such as Burghers and others. Religions include Islam, Buddhism, Hinduism, Christianity and various other religions and beliefs.

Infrastructure 
Slave Island is served by the Slave Island Railway Station.  Built with Victorian-era architectural embellishments, the station carries significant architectural and historic value.  The building features stylish arches, intricate woodwork and metal installations, which emphasise Victorian-era styles.

Demolitions 
Many historic buildings in the Slave Island were either demolished or are awaiting to be demolished due to recent high rise development. Despite the architectural and historic value most buildings are not properly maintained and as a result most have become run down. The shophouse-style buildings in Justice Akbar Mawatha which are to be demolished is said to be the place where D.R. Wijewardene, D.S. Senanayake and Oliver Goonetilleke met to discuss the constitutional reforms that led to Sri Lanka's independence in 1948.

Military
 Rifle Barracks
 Sri Lanka Electrical and Mechanical Engineers (SLEME)

Diplomatic missions
Honorary Consulate of the Republic of Cyprus
Embassy of the Kingdom of Thailand
Honorary Consulate of Madagascar
Consulate of the Republic of the Philippines
Royal Norwegian Embassy
High Commission of New Zealand

Photos

References

Districts of Colombo
Populated places in Western Province, Sri Lanka